Le Lorrain is a town and commune in the French overseas region and department of Martinique.

Population

Personalities
Raphaël Confiant
Jean Bernabé

See also
Communes of the Martinique department

References

External links

Communes of Martinique
Populated places in Martinique